Mary Beaumont Welch (July 3, 1841 – January 2, 1923) was an American educator and suffragist. Welch, who taught at what later became Iowa State University, developed the first home economics classes given for college credit. She also wrote the first book on the topic called Mrs. Welch's Cookbook, publishing in 1884.

Biography 
Welch was born in Lyons, New York, on July 3, 1841. Welch graduated from Elmira Seminary and worked as a teacher. Her first husband, George E. Dudley, whom she married in 1858, died in 1860. Welch married Adonijah Welch on February 3, 1868. She had two children with her first husband and two with Adonijah.

Welch created the Department of Domestic Economy at Iowa State and these classes were the first on the subject to award college credit. She was head of the department from 1875 to 1883. Her original curriculum included tying the sciences to domestic economy. Welch published the first book on home economics in 1884, called Mrs. Welch's Cookbook.

The Iowa Woman Suffrage Association (IWSA) elected Welch president in 1888.

In 1889, Adonijah died and the next year, Welch married Dwight Welch. At the end of December of 1923, Welch had a severe stroke and three days later on January 2, died in her home in Pasadena, California. Her ashes were returned to Ames and buried next to Adonijah in the college cemetery. 

Welch was inducted into the Iowa Women's Hall of Fame in 1992.

References

External links 
 Mrs. Welch's Cookbook

1841 births
1923 deaths
Iowa State University faculty
People from Ames, Iowa
People from Lyons, New York
American educators
American suffragists
Home economists